"Breakin' Away" / "That's Livin' Alright" is a double A-side single by English singer Joe Fagin. The songs were produced and arranged by David Mackay.

Mackay co-wrote "Breakin' Away" with Ian La Frenais, and "That's Livin' Alright" with Ken Ashby. They wrote the songs as the opening and closing theme music for Auf Wiedersehen, Pet, an English television comedy-drama that premiered in 1983. Ian La Frenais co-wrote Auf Wiedersehen, Pet with Dick Clement.

"That's Livin' Alright" peaked at #3 on the UK Singles Chart in January 1984. Later that year, Friends Records (Netherlands) and Mariann Grammofon (Sweden) reissued "That's Livin' Alright" as the A-side of a 7" single called "That's Living Alright".

For England's national football team's 2006 FIFA World Cup campaign, Fagin performed "That's England Alright", a variation of "That's Livin' Alright" produced by Clive Langer, with lyrics by Jimmy Lawless.

Track listing

References

External links
 

1983 singles
Comedy television theme songs
Television drama theme songs